Black Peak is a mountain (elevation ) and the highest peak in the Pohorje or Bacher Mountains in Slovenia.

Location and nature 

Black Peak lies northeast of Mislinja and much of it is covered in forest.

References

One-thousanders of Slovenia
Mountains of the Alps
Mountains of Slovenia